Kate Cullen, also known as Katie, (born 20 May 1977) is a Scottish racing cyclist from Edinburgh who won bronze in the points race at the 2006 Commonwealth Games in Melbourne.

Biography 

Cullen began cycling after she began a project whilst studying to become an Architect at the Glasgow School of Art. She hypothetically designed a velodrome and visited Manchester Velodrome, where she had a go at riding the track. Cullen enjoyed the experience so much she began cycling at Meadowbank Stadium once she had returned to Edinburgh.

Palmarès 

2005
1st  British National Derny Championships
2nd Points race, British National Track Championships

2006
1st  Points race, British National Track Championships
3rd Points race, Commonwealth Games

2007
1st  Points race, British National Track Championships
1st  Scratch race, British National Track Championships

See also
City of Edinburgh Racing Club
Achievements of members of City of Edinburgh Racing Club

References

External links 
 Profile and diaries at the Braveheart Cycling Fund

1977 births
Living people
Scottish female cyclists
Scottish track cyclists
Sportspeople from Edinburgh
Cyclists at the 2010 Commonwealth Games
Commonwealth Games medallists in cycling
Commonwealth Games bronze medallists for Scotland
Medallists at the 2002 Commonwealth Games